Ahmadabad (also Romanized as Aḩmadābād; also known as Tāzehābād-e Kowlīhā) is a village in Howmeh-ye Sarpol Rural District, in the Central District of Sarpol-e Zahab County, Kermanshah Province, Iran. At the 2006 census, its population was 660, in 158 families.

References 

Populated places in Sarpol-e Zahab County